Ashifi Gogo co-founded Sproxil in 2009 to fight the proliferation of counterfeit drugs in Africa.

Education
Gogo received a Bachelor of Arts degree from Whitman College in 2005, earning a double major in Mathematics and Physics. He received his PhD in Engineering from Dartmouth College.
He also attended his early education in Ghana. He was at Kwame Nkrumah University of Science and Technology primary and Junior High School.

Honors and awards
Gogo was named to  Fortune's 2005 '40 under 40' list of the most influential business people.

References

Whitman College alumni
Thayer School of Engineering alumni